DefCom Australia is a  loyalty card purchasing scheme for:
regular and full-time Reserve members of the Australian Defence Force;
certain 'Protector' organisations, such as firefighters, ambulance and emergency response personnel including the Wireless Institute of Australia's emergency response amateur radio personnel, etc.;
and (fee may apply):
Defence civilian staff;
family members of the above (fee may apply); and
certain other categories of people similar to these.

History 

The Government of Australia established the scheme instead of establishing an organisation similar to the United States' Base/Post exchange shops. The Defence Force Discount Buying Scheme commenced operations in April 1990. Known as the Defence Force Privilege Card scheme, it was developed by Defcom Pty. Ltd. (private enterprise) and is designed to give ADF members, their families and former members of the ADF the opportunity to buy a wide range of goods and services at discount rates. Later, the organisations and people participating as members was opened up to 'protector' organisations.

Scheme
DefCom establishes discount relationships with franchise groups and individual businesses in areas of high concentration of Defence and similar personnel.

Members use an annually issued directory, or the scheme web site, to find a participating business selling the item they require.

The member presents the membership card at the time of purchase and claims the discount. Haggling may follow this.

Merchandise and services
Merchandise offered includes:
Accommodation
Cars — New & Used
Credit Cards (MasterCard and Visa card)
Holidays
Finance and Investment services
Leisure & Theme Parks
Merchants — Local Traders in each area, State and National Companies, Online marketing
Wine club

See also
Department of Defence (Australia)
Base exchange

References

External links
DefCom official site

Customer loyalty programs in Australia
Military pay and benefits
Marketing companies of Australia
Australian Defence Force